The Man Who Wouldn't Talk is a 1940 mystery film directed by David Burton and starring Lloyd Nolan, Jean Rogers, and Richard Clarke. It is a remake of the 1929 film The Valiant which had starred Paul Muni, and was based on a play of the same name. It was Nolan's first film for Twentieth Century Fox, where he went on to be a successful star of B Movie mysteries such as the Michael Shayne series. Nolan's portrayal of the lead character was deliberately more subdued than Muni's had been, and the film was "opened up" with the addition of flashback scenes and other devices to make it less dialogue-based than the original.

Synopsis
A man shoots dead a business leader and confesses to the killing, but refuses to say anything more than providing the name Joe Monday, which is obviously an alias. His attorney joins forces with a woman claiming that she is his sister and that he is really a soldier reported missing during World War I. Still, the accused refuses to offer further information. He is tried for murder, with the case seemingly hanging on events from over twenty years earlier when the dead man and the accused had served in the same infantry company in France.

Main cast
 Lloyd Nolan as Joe Monday
 Jean Rogers as Alice Stetson
 Richard Clarke as Steve Phillips
 Onslow Stevens as Frederick Keller
 Eric Blore as Horace Parker
 Joan Valerie as Miss Norton
 Mae Marsh as Mrs. Stetson
 Paul Stanton as Attorney Cluett
 Douglas Wood as Walker
 Irving Bacon as Paul Gillis
 Lester Sharpe as Henri Picot
 Harlan Briggs as Foreman in Jury
 Elisabeth Risdon as Jury Member
 Renie Riano as Lilly Wigham

References

Bibliography
  Schlossheimer, Michael. Gunmen and Gangsters: Profiles of Nine Actors Who Portrayed Memorable Screen Tough Guys. McFarland, 2001.

External links
 

1940 films
Films directed by David Burton
20th Century Fox films
Remakes of American films
Sound film remakes of silent films
Films set in France
Films set in the 1910s
Films produced by Sol M. Wurtzel
1940s mystery drama films
American mystery drama films
1940 drama films
Films scored by Samuel Kaylin
1940s English-language films
1940s American films